The Back Bone Silver is a French paramotor that was designed by Thierry Simonet and produced by Back Bone of Tallard for powered paragliding. Now out of production, when it was available the aircraft was supplied complete and ready-to-fly.

Design and development
The Silver was designed to comply with the US FAR 103 Ultralight Vehicles rules as well as European regulations. It features a paraglider-style wing, single-place accommodation and a single with a  RDM 200 engine in pusher configuration with a 4:1 ratio reduction drive and a  diameter two-bladed wooden propeller.

As is the case with all paramotors, take-off and landing is accomplished by foot. Inflight steering is accomplished via handles that actuate the canopy brakes, creating roll and yaw.

Specifications (Silver)

References

Shadow
2000s French ultralight aircraft
Single-engined pusher aircraft
Paramotors